Benjamin Zendel is a Canadian psychologist, currently a Canada Research Chair in Aging and Auditory Neuroscience at Memorial University. He is the PI for the Cognitive Aging and Auditory Neuroscience Laboratory

References

Year of birth missing (living people)
Living people
Academic staff of the Memorial University of Newfoundland
Canadian psychologists